Arhopala azinis is a species of butterfly belonging to the lycaenid family described by Lionel de Nicéville in 1896. It is found in Southeast Asia (Peninsular Malaya, Sumatra and Java).

Subspecies
Arhopala azinis azinis (Peninsular Malaysia, Sumatra, Java)
Arhopala azinis kounga Bethune-Baker, 1896 (Borneo)

References

Arhopala
Butterflies described in 1896
Butterflies of Asia
Taxa named by Lionel de Nicéville